Oduthurai is a village in Puducherry, India. It is one of the three revenue villages in Neravy Taluk, Karaikal district. It is located west from Karaikal city.

References

Villages in Karaikal district